The Deviants may refer to:

 The Deviants (film), a 2004 independent comedy about a dating agency for sex deviants
 The Deviants (band), a rock band formerly known as the Social Deviants
 The Deviants 3 (1969), the third and final 1960s album by The Deviants

See also 
 Deviant (disambiguation)